Echtler is a surname. Notable people with the surname include:

 Adolf Echtler (1843–1914), German genre painter
 Martin Echtler (born 1969), German ski mountaineer